The women's discus throw was one of three women's throwing events on the Athletics at the 1964 Summer Olympics program in Tokyo.  It was held on 19 October 1964.  22 athletes from 15 nations entered, with 1 not starting in the qualification round.

Results

Qualification

The qualification standard was 50.00 metres.  Each thrower had three attempts to reach that standard.

Final

The marks for the qualification were ignored in the final.  Each thrower had three attempts; the top six after those three received three more and counted their best mark of the six.  All five of the top throwers defeated the old Olympic record.

References

Athletics at the 1964 Summer Olympics
Discus throw at the Olympics
1964 in women's athletics
Women's events at the 1964 Summer Olympics